Clostridium frigidicarnis is a Gram-positive and psychrotolerant bacterium from the genus Clostridium which has been isolated from beef in New Zealand.

References

 

Bacteria described in 1999
frigidicarnis